The BBC Radio 4 programme Desert Island Discs invites castaways to choose eight pieces of music, a book (in addition to the Bible – or a religious text appropriate to that person's beliefs – and the Complete Works of Shakespeare) and a luxury item that they would take to an imaginary desert island, where they will be marooned indefinitely. The rules state that the chosen luxury item must not be anything animate or indeed anything that enables the castaway to escape from the island, for instance a radio set, sailing yacht or aeroplane. The choices of book and luxury can sometimes give insight into the guest's life, and the choices of guests between 1991 and 2000 are listed here.

1991

1992

1993

1994

1995

1996

1997

1998

1999

2000

Episodes (1991-2000)
Desert Island Discs episodes (1991-2000)
1990s in the United Kingdom
Desert
2000s in the United Kingdom
2000s in British music